Ufuwai Bonet is the monarch of Gworok (Kagoro) Chiefdom, a Nigerian traditional state in southern Kaduna State, Nigeria. He is also known by the title "Chief of Kagoro (Gworok)". As of 2016, he is the deputy chairman of the Kaduna State council of chiefs and emirs.

In 2011, he led the Kaduna State Christians to pilgrimage in Israel, Egypt, Rome and Greece, in which two absconded.

In January 2017, while addressing the Nigerian Chief of Defense Staff, General Abayomi Olonisakin on a visit to his palace after the attacks by Fulani terrorists, he assured:  Later in February, in an address to the CAN, over the same issue, Bonet admonished:  He also decried the security situation in the area during the 2019 edition of the Afan National Cultural Festival, which he hosted.

During the COVID-19 lockdown in 2020, he urged the people, village and ward heads in his realm to abide by the lockdown orders as liquor sellers hesitated to comply.

References

Living people
People from Kaduna State
Nigerian traditional rulers
African monarchs
Year of birth missing (living people)